The 6th Infantry Division was an infantry division of the Hellenic Army.

History
Founded during the mobilization for the First Balkan War in autumn 1912 under Colonel Konstantinos Miliotis-Komninos, it served in the Balkan Wars, but was disbanded during the National Schism. In autumn 1916, the Serres Division (Μεραρχία Σερρών) was formed by the Provisional Government of National Defence as its first major military formation, and was sent to the Macedonian front. In December 1920, the division was renamed to 6th Infantry Division. The division fought in the Asia Minor Campaign and the Greco-Italian War, until its disbandment following the German invasion of Greece in 1941. It was reformed in 1946 from the 25th, 26th and 27th Brigades as part of the III Army Corps. Initially based at Kavala, from 1952 until its disbandment in 2003 it was based at Kilkis. In the period 1960–1998 the division came under the II Army Corps.

Infantry divisions of Greece
Kilkis (regional unit)
1912 establishments in Greece
Military units and formations of Greece in World War II
Military units and formations established in 1912
Military units and formations disestablished in 2003
2003 disestablishments in Greece
Military units and formations of Greece in the Greco-Turkish War (1919–1922)
Military units and formations of Greece in the Balkan Wars